The 1949–50 Boston Celtics season was the fourth season of the Boston Celtics in the National Basketball Association (NBA). This was the last time the Celtics both finished below .500, and missed the playoffs until the 1969–70 season.

Draft

Roster

|-
! colspan="2" style="background-color: #008040;  color: #FFFFFF; text-align: center;" | Boston Celtics 1949–50 roster
|- style="background-color: #FFFFFF; color: #008040;   text-align: center;"
! Players !! Coaches
|-
| valign="top" |

! Pos. !! # !! Nat. !! Name !! Ht. !! Wt. !! From
|-

Regular season

Season standings

Record vs. opponents

Game log

References

Boston Celtics seasons
Boston Celtics
Boston Celtics
Boston Celtics
1940s in Boston
1950s in Boston